The Balonne River, part of the Murray-Darling Basin system, is a short yet significant part of the inland river group of South West Queensland, Australia.

Course and features
The river is a continuation of the Condamine River. After flowing through Surat the river flows south south-westerly down through the E.J. Beardmore Dam (Lake Kajarabie). The eastern branch continues on as the Balonne River through Dirranbandi. Shortly after flowing through Dirranbandi, the Balonne River again branches into the Bokhara River on the west side (the right side when going down stream) and the Narran River on the eastern (left) side. The Narran River flows into Narran Wetlands. The Bokhara River joins with the Barwon River west of Brewarrina. The confluence of the Culgoa River (a western branch of the Balonne River) and the Barwon River (which includes a former central branch of the Balonne) forms the start of the Darling River.

The five longest tributaries of the Balonne River are the Condamine River, the Maranoa River, Dogwood Creek, Yuleba Creek and Tartulla Creek. At St George, the river is crossed by the Andrew Nixon Bridge which carries the Balonne Highway.

Water storage

E.J. Beardmore Dam was formed by the construction of a weir in 1972 at the junction of the Maranoa and Balonne Rivers. When the dam is full the water backs up for  along the Balonne. Downstream from Beardmore Dam is the Jack Taylor Weir, which was built in 1953. On the Balonne tributary, Dogwood Creek there is another weir, the Gill Weir, which can hold .

History
Major Thomas Mitchell crossed the Balonne River on St George's Day, 23 April 1846. Mitchell named the river after the Mandandanji word for water or running stream, balun or balonn or balonne.

Gallery

See also

 Andrew Nixon Bridge

References

Rivers of Queensland
Tributaries of the Darling River
South West Queensland